{{Infobox election
| election_name = 2004 United States Senate election in Maryland
| country = Maryland
| type = presidential
| ongoing = no
| previous_election = 1998 United States Senate election in Maryland
| previous_year = 1998
| next_election = 2010 United States Senate election in Maryland
| next_year = 2010
| election_date = November 2, 2004
| image_size = x150px
| image1 = Barbara Mikulski.jpg
| nominee1 = Barbara Mikulski
| party1 = Democratic Party (United States)
| popular_vote1 = 1,504,691
| percentage1 = 64.8%
| image2 = 1senatorpipkin1.jpg
| nominee2 = E. J. Pipkin
| party2 = Republican Party (United States)
| popular_vote2 = 783,055
| percentage2 = 33.7%
| map_image = 2004 United States Senate election in Maryland results map by county.svg
| map_size           = 275px
| map_caption        = County resultsMikulski:     Pipkin:   
| title = U.S. Senator
| before_election = Barbara Mikulski
| before_party = Democratic Party (United States)
| after_election = Barbara Mikulski
| after_party = Democratic Party (United States)
}}

The 2004 United States Senate election in Maryland''' was held on November 2, 2004. Incumbent Democratic U.S. Senator Barbara Mikulski won re-election to a fourth term. This is the most recent time that a Democratic Senate candidate has won Allegeny County, Caroline County, St. Mary's County or Worcester County.

Democratic primary

Candidates 
 Barbara Mikulski, incumbent U.S. Senator
 Robert Kaufman, social organizer
 Sid Altman, accountant

Results

Republican primary

Candidates 
 Ray Bly, Vietnam War veteran
 Earl S. Gordon, surveyor
 Dorothy Curry Jennings, educator
 James A. Kodak, research associate at the University of Maryland
 Eileen Martin, educator
 E. J. Pipkin, State Senator
 John Stafford, government bureaucrat
 Corrogan R. Vaughn, Baptist deacon
 Gene Zarwell, perennial candidate

Results

General election

Candidates 
 Maria Allwine (G)
 Barbara Mikulski (D), incumbent U.S. Senator
 E. J. Pipkin (R), State Senator
 Thomas Trump (C)

Predictions

Results

See also 
 2004 United States Senate elections

References 

2004 Maryland elections
Maryland